Yuriy Karmelyuk (born 2 July 1971) was a Ukrainian footballer and manager.

He is known as one of the coaches of FC Olimpik Donetsk.

References

External links
 
 Yuriy Karmelyuk. Luhansk Our Football portal

1971 births
2008 suicides
Soviet footballers
Ukrainian footballers
Association football midfielders
FC CSKA Kyiv players
FC Aton Donetsk players
FC Skala Stryi (1911) players
FC Metalurh Donetsk players
FC Metalurh-2 Donetsk players
FC Olimpik Donetsk players
FC Tytan Donetsk players
Ukrainian Premier League managers
FC Olimpik Donetsk managers
FC Tytan Donetsk managers
Ukrainian Premier League players
Ukrainian expatriate footballers
Expatriate footballers in Russia
Ukrainian football managers
Suicides in Ukraine